Nguyễn Thị Thanh Phúc (born 12 August 1980 in Da Nang, Vietnam) is a Vietnamese race-walker. She competed for Vietnam at the 2012 Summer Olympics. Her brother, Nguyễn Thành Ngưng, also competed for Vietnam in race walking.

References

External links
 

1980 births
Living people
Vietnamese racewalkers
Female racewalkers
Athletes (track and field) at the 2012 Summer Olympics
Olympic athletes of Vietnam
Athletes (track and field) at the 2014 Asian Games
Vietnamese female athletes
World Athletics Championships athletes for Vietnam
People from Da Nang
Southeast Asian Games medalists in athletics
Southeast Asian Games gold medalists for Vietnam
Competitors at the 2011 Southeast Asian Games
Competitors at the 2013 Southeast Asian Games
Competitors at the 2015 Southeast Asian Games
Asian Games competitors for Vietnam
21st-century Vietnamese women